is a professional Japanese 9 dan Go player currently affiliated with the Nihon Ki-in. He is both the son and student of Yasumasa Hane 9 dan.

Titles and runners-up 
Ranks 13th in total number of titles won in Japan.

Promotion record

Awards
Reached 500 career wins in 2002.
Reached 600 career wins in 2005.
New Player Award once (1995)
Most wins; 48 (1996), 50 (1997), 68 (2001)
Most consecutive wins; 19 (1999)
Best Player Award twice (2001, 2003)
Most games played; 88 (2001)
Hidetoshi Prize once (2001)

References

External links
 Nihon Ki-in profile 

1976 births
Japanese Go players
Living people